Hushang was the 32nd ruler of Shirvan and last member of the Kasranid branch of House of Shirvanshah.

Reign
He succeeded his father Shirvanshah Kavus in 1372. Until then, he was a captive in court of Shaikh Awais Jalayir. Taking advantage of latter's death, he asserted his authority in Shirvan again. He acted as a mediator between rival Jalayirids without success. His coins also bore names Shaikh Hussain Jalayir and Ahmad Jalayir, meaning they were nominal overlords between 1374 and 1410. He was a well-educated man and a poet. He was deposed and killed in 1382 by local nobles. Having no issue, he was succeeded by his first cousin-once-removed Ibrahim I of Shirvan.

References

1382 deaths
Year of birth unknown
14th-century Iranian people